Avandhan Manidhan is a 1975 Indian Tamil-language drama film, co-written and directed by A. C. Tirulokchandar from a story by G. Balasubramaniam. The film stars Sivaji Ganesan, Muthuraman, Jayalalithaa and Manjula. It revolves around an extremely generous man who refuses to budge from his nature, even as it leads to his downfall.

After Balasubramaniam wrote the story exclusively for Ganesan, director K. Shankar and producer Noor were attached. Ganesan however refused, and the story was later filmed in Kannada as Kasturi Nivasa (1971). After that film's success, Ganesan agreed to act in a potential Tamil remake, which became Avandhan Manidhan, his 175th film as an actor. The new film was directed by Tirulokchandar, produced by A. Ramanujam and K. N. Subramanian, photographed by M. Viswanatha Rai and edited by B. Kandhasamy.

Avandhan Manidhan was released on 11 April 1975. The film became a commercial success, running for over 100 days in theatres.

Plot 

Ravi, the owner of a matchbox factory, is a widower and lost his daughter in an accident. Recognising that his honest employee Chandran is in a similar position, he decides to help Chandran financially. As Chandran attends training in the United States, Ravi takes care of Chandran's charming daughter. On return, Chandran suggests changing the company's structure. The traditionalist Ravi becomes infuriated. Protesting this, Chandran resigns and starts his own matchbox company and becomes the leading matchbox manufacturer.

This begins Ravi's downfall, his charity and donating activities have eaten up profit and he ends up putting his house on sale. Chandran calls for the highest bid and wants to give it back to Ravi, but being the man that he is, Ravi would not accept. Chandran has already got Lalitha, his ex-secretary on whom Ravi had a crush on, and now Ravi's house.

Film ends on a tragic note when all Ravi has is his Dove, and Lalitha requests him to give it her, as her daughter is sick and is crying for Ravi uncle's Dove. Ravi has just sold that, so that he could feed. Unable to say no to a request he breathes his last.

Cast 
Sivaji Ganesan as Ravikumar
Muthuraman as Chandran
Jayalalithaa as Lalitha
Manjula as Manju
Major Sundarrajan as Murugan
Cho as Appavu
M. R. R. Vasu as Paramasivam
Chandrababu as Singaram
Sachu as Kamala
Baby Sumathi as Selvi

Production 
In early 1970, G. Balasubramaniam had written a story exclusively for Sivaji Ganesan, and film producer Noor bought the rights for  25,000, with K. Shankar signed on to direct. However, Ganesan was reluctant after hearing the story, feeling it was too tragic. A year later, the same story was bought by the director duo Dorai–Bhagavan for  38,000, and they made it into a Kannada film titled Kasturi Nivasa, with Rajkumar starring. After the film's success, Ganesan decided to remake it in Tamil, and bought the remake rights for  2,00,000. The remake was titled Avandhan Manidhan, and the 175th film of Ganesan. It was directed by A. C. Tirulokchandar, co-produced by K. N. Subramaniam, photographed by M. Viswanatha Rai and edited by B. Kandhasamy. While Tirulokchandar also wrote the screenplay, Panchu Arunachalam wrote the dialogues.

Themes 
Film historian Mohan Raman interpreted one scene where Cho's character tells Chandrababu's character, "Ellarum Ungala Marandutaanga pa" (Everyone has forgotten you, man) as reflecting Chandrababu's real life situation at that time.

Soundtrack 
The music was composed by M. S. Viswanathan, with lyrics by Kannadasan. The song "Aattuviththaal Yaaroruvar", like many songs written by Kannadasan, extols the Hindu god Krishna.

Release and reception 

Avandhan Manidhan was released on 11 April 1975. Kanthan of Kalki praised Tirulokchander's direction and writing, Arunachalam's dialogues, and Muthuraman's performance. The film became a commercial success, running for over 100 days in theatres.

References

External links 
 

1970s Tamil-language films
1975 drama films
1975 films
Films directed by A. C. Tirulokchandar
Films scored by M. S. Viswanathan
Indian drama films
Tamil remakes of Kannada films